Thanasis Kingley (1928 – 6 May 2004) was a Greek footballer. He played in five matches for the Greece national football team from 1953 to 1954. He was also part of Greece's team for their qualification matches for the 1954 FIFA World Cup.

References

External links
 

1928 births
2004 deaths
Greece international footballers
Place of birth missing
Association footballers not categorized by position
Footballers from Athens
Greek footballers
Footballers from Piraeus